is a railway station in the city of Iwakura, Aichi Prefecture,  Japan, operated by Meitetsu.

Lines

Station layout
The station has two opposed side platforms connected by a level crossing. The station has automated ticket machines, Manaca automated turnstiles and is unattended.

Platforms

Adjacent stations

|-
!colspan=5|Nagoya Railroad

Station history
Taisanji Station was opened on February 5, 1915. It has been unattended since March 1952. The station building was rebuilt in January 2004.

Passenger statistics
In fiscal 2017, the station was used by an average of 2091 passengers daily.

Surrounding area
 Sono Elementary School
 Sono housing area

See also
 List of Railway Stations in Japan

References

External links

 Official web page 

Railway stations in Japan opened in 1912
Railway stations in Aichi Prefecture
Stations of Nagoya Railroad
Iwakura, Aichi